Blinkeyes is a 1926 British silent drama film directed by George Pearson and starring Betty Balfour, Tom Douglas, and Frank Stanmore.

It was shot at Cricklewood Studios in London. It was the final collaboration between Pearson and Balfour and was considered a disappointment compared to their earlier work.

Cast
 Betty Balfour as Blinkeyes  
 Tom Douglas as Ken Clay 
 Frank Stanmore as Flowerpots  
 Patrick Aherne as The Basher  
 Hubert Carter as Clary  
 Dorothy Seacombe as Bella  
 J. Fisher White as Uncle Dick  
 Mary Dibley as Mrs. Banning  
 Frank Vosper as Seymour

References

Bibliography
 Low, Rachael. History of the British Film, 1918-1929. George Allen & Unwin, 1971.

External links

1926 films
British drama films
British silent feature films
1926 drama films
1920s English-language films
Films directed by George Pearson
Films set in England
Films shot at Cricklewood Studios
British black-and-white films
1920s British films
Silent drama films